St Alban's Church, built in 1898, in Pauatahanui, Porirua is the second church to be built in Pauatahanui, New Zealand.  St Alban's Church was listed by the New Zealand Historic Places Trust (since renamed to Heritage New Zealand) as a Category 2 historic place in 1983.

The building is on the old site of the Matai Paua pā, that was built by Te Rangihaeata, the Ngāti Toa leader in 1846. The church was designed by Frederick de Jersey Clere.

Services are held weekly on Sundays at 11am, parish news can be found on the website: http://www.pauanglican.org.nz/

References

Wellington
Buildings and structures in Porirua
Heritage New Zealand Category 2 historic places in the Wellington Region
Religious buildings and structures in the Wellington Region
Frederick de Jersey Clere church buildings
Listed churches in New Zealand
1890s architecture in New Zealand